This list of museums in Puerto Rico contains museums which are defined for this context as institutions (including nonprofit organizations, government entities, and private businesses) that collect and care for objects of cultural, artistic, scientific, or historical interest and make their collections or related exhibits available for public viewing. Museums that exist only in cyberspace (i.e., virtual museums) are not included.

Former museums
 Casa Rosa, a historic house or barracks in San Juan, was for a time a museum used for Puerto Rican crafts

See also

 Botanical gardens in Puerto Rico (category)
 Houses in Puerto Rico (category)
 Forts in Puerto Rico (category)
 Nature Centers in Puerto Rico
 Observatories in Puerto Rico (category)
 Registered Historic Places in Puerto Rico

References

External links

 Yahoo Travel: Puerto Rico Museums

Museums
Museums
Museums
Puerto Rico
Puerto Rico